Tren de Aragua is the largest criminal organization in Venezuela, with over 2,700 members. In addition to its home-state of Aragua, the organization also has a presence in other states in Venezuela, such as: Carabobo, Sucre, Bolívar, Guárico, Trujillo and Miranda. Tren de Aragua is led by Héctor Rusthenford Guerrero Flores, alias “Niño Guerrero"; he is currently incarcerated in Tocorón prison, which functions as the organization's headquarters. Tren de Aragua is also the first Venezuelan criminal organization to expand internationally; it has a presence in Colombia, Brazil, Peru, Ecuador, Bolivia and Chile. The organization engages in a variety of criminal activities, such as protection racketeering, drug-trafficking, arms-trafficking, human-trafficking, pimping, kidnappings-for-ransom, illegal mining, chop shops, human smuggling, witness tampering, bribery, and money laundering. Amidst the Tarapacá migrant crisis in northern Chile, Tren de Aragua engaged in trafficking of women across from the Bolivian border to Santiago. By October 2021 there were reports Chilean authorities were conducting four different investigations related to the criminal organisation. On March 24, 2022 Investigations Police of Chile (PDI) declared to have dismantled the Chilean branch of Tren de Aragua. One of the Tren de Aragua members captured in March 2022 had Interpol arrest warrants for murders in Venezuela and Peru. Six other migrant traffickers of Tren de Aragua were also captured in March 2022 by Chilean police.

References

2010s establishments in Venezuela
2020s establishments in Chile
Transnational organized crime
Organized crime groups in Venezuela
Venezuelan emigrants to Chile
Venezuelan refugee crisis